R341 road may refer to:
 R341 road (Ireland)
 R341 road (South Africa)